Wave mechanics may refer to:

 the mechanics of waves
 the wave equation in quantum physics, see Schrödinger equation

See also 
 Quantum mechanics
 Wave equation